New Europe Film Sales is a Polish independent film distributor. The company was founded in Warsaw in 2010 by Jan Naszewski of the New Horizons Film Festival.

References

External links 

2010 establishments in Poland
Companies based in Warsaw
Film production companies of Poland
Film distributors of Poland
Video on demand services
International sales agents